Consort  is a village in eastern Alberta, Canada.

Demographics 

In the 2016 Census of Population conducted by Statistics Canada, the Village of Consort recorded a population of 729 living in 280 of its 310 total private dwellings, a  change from its 2011 population of 689.

Consort's 2012 municipal census counted a population of 722.

Economy 
The primary industries are farming, ranching and oil production.

Media 
The local weekly newspaper, The Consort Enterprise, has been published since 1912.

Notable people 
Singer k.d. lang was raised in Consort, as was Arthur Kroeger, a senior public servant in the Canadian federal government from 1975 to 1992. Riley Nash, a forward in the NHL for the Boston Bruins and the Columbus Blue Jackets was born in Consort.

See also 
List of communities in Alberta
List of villages in Alberta

References

External links 

1912 establishments in Alberta
Special Area No. 4
Villages in Alberta